Mission Bell is the fourth studio album by American musician Amos Lee, released on January 25, 2011. The album features Willie Nelson, Lucinda Williams, Sam Beam, Priscilla Ahn, Pieta Brown, James Gadson, and Calexico. Joey Burns, of Calexico produced the album.  Mission Bell debuted at #1 on the Billboard 200, selling 40,000 copies in its first week, which is the lowest total for a #1 album in the Soundscan era. These sales broke the record set by Cake's Showroom of Compassion when it sold 44,000 two weeks previous. The following week Mission Bell dropped from #1 to #26, the fourth-largest drop from #1 on the Billboard 200 as of January 2017. It shares this honor with the 1975's 2016 album I Like It When You Sleep, for You Are So Beautiful yet So Unaware of It.

Track listing
All songs written by Amos Lee.
El Camino – 4:02
Windows Are Rolled Down – 3:57
Violin (featuring Sam Beam) – 5:18
Flower – 3:41
Stay with Me (featuring Priscilla Ahn) – 3:13
Out of the Cold (featuring Pieta Brown) – 3:03
Jesus (featuring James Gadson) – 3:21
Hello Again – 4:09
Learned a Lot – 4:30
Cup of Sorrow – 3:51
Clear Blue Eyes (featuring Lucinda Williams) – 3:02
Behind Me Now / El Camino Reprise (featuring Willie Nelson) – 9:10

Personnel
Amos Lee – vocal, guitar, fuzz guitar, vibraphone
Joey Burns – bass, guitar, backing vocal, keyboards, vibraphone
Jaron Olevsky – keyboards, percussion, backing vocal, bass, guitar, banjo
Greg Leisz – steel guitar, guitar, mandolin, dobro
John Convertino – drums, thunder drum
James Gadson – drums, tambourine, backing vocal
Jacob Valenzuela – trumpets
Craig Schumacher – synth bass, harmonica
Johnny O'Halloran – bowed saw
Brian Lopez – backing vocal
Sam Beam – backing vocal
Priscilla Ahn – backing vocal
Pieta Brown – backing vocal
Zach Djanikian – backing vocal
Mutlu Onaral – backing vocal
Lucinda Williams – vocal
Willie Nelson – vocal, nylon string guitar
Silver Thread Trio:
Gabrielle Pietrangelo – backing vocal
Laura Kepner-Adney – backing vocal
Caroline Isaacs – backing vocal

Charts

Weekly charts

Year-end charts

References

Amos Lee albums
Blue Note Records albums
2011 albums